The Ichthys gas field is a natural gas field located in the Timor Sea, off the northwestern coast of Australia.

First Gas from the Ichthys field was achieved on 30 July 2018.  The first condensate cargo was loaded on 1 October 2018, followed by the first LNG cargo on 22 October 2018 with the first LPG cargo planned for later in 2018. Production of LNG will be facilitated through an onshore liquefaction plant located at Bladin Point, near Darwin, which will be connected to the offshore Ichthys field by an  subsea pipeline. The LNG plant has a nominal plant capacity of 8.9 million tonnes per annum (mtpa) which will be achieved through two LNG processing trains.

It is one of the largest LNG giga-projects in the world, with an initial project cost of US$34 billion. However, this cost was subsequently increased to US$37 billion and it is the largest overseas project undertaken by a Japanese company. While the total cost of the Chevron-sponsored Gorgon project is higher, the Ichthys project is more expensive per tonne of production due to the great distance between the offshore field and the onshore terminal. The infrastructure is being constructed by a joint venture between JGC Corporation, KBR and Chiyoda Corporation, with technical contributions by Samsung Heavy Industries, General Electric, McDermott and other contractors.

Like the CPF it is designed to last 40 years, much longer than a typical FPSO, which is vital due to the need to ensure liquids are removed from the gas trunkline to the Bladin point LNG plant. In a first, unlike other FPSOs mooring systems which are designed to allow the FPSO to disconnect, the Ichthys Venturer will be permanently moored on the turret. Most FPSOs disconnect and sail away when a cyclone approaches as their turrets are not designed to cope with the stresses/strains from cyclonic conditions. However, the LNG production as part of the Ichthys development requires the Ichthys Venturer to remain operational.

The tropical cyclones that the facilities are designed to withstand "swell with periods of 6-18 seconds from any direction and with wave heights of  additionally, "current speeds may reach  and occasionally exceed  in the near-surface water layer".

References

Natural gas fields in Australia
Timor Sea